The Lion King is a 2019 American musical drama film directed and produced by Jon Favreau, written by Jeff Nathanson, and produced by Walt Disney Pictures and Fairview Entertainment. It is a photorealistic computer-animated remake of Disney's traditionally animated 1994 film of the same name. The film stars the voices of Donald Glover, Seth Rogen, Chiwetel Ejiofor, Alfre Woodard, Billy Eichner, John Kani, John Oliver, Florence Kasumba, Eric André, Keegan-Michael Key, JD McCrary, Shahadi Wright Joseph, and Beyoncé Knowles-Carter, as well as James Earl Jones reprising his role from the original film. The plot follows Simba, a young lion who must embrace his role as the rightful king of his homeland following the murder of his father, Mufasa, at the hands of his uncle, Scar.

Plans for a remake of 1994's The Lion King were confirmed in September 2016 with Favreau attached to directed following box office successes for Disney remakes such as The Jungle Book (2016), which was also directed by Favreau. Disney hired Nathanson to write the screenplay in October 2016. Favreau was inspired by certain roles of characters in the Broadway adaptation, and developed upon elements of the original film's story. Much of the main cast signed in early 2017, and principal photography began in mid-2017 on a blue screen stage in Los Angeles. The "virtual-reality tools" utilized in The Jungle Books cinematography were used to a greater degree during filming of The Lion King. Composers Hans Zimmer, Elton John, and lyricist Tim Rice, all of whom worked on the original's soundtrack, returned to compose the score alongside Knowles-Carter, who assisted John in the reworking of the soundtrack and wrote a new song for the film, titled "Spirit", which she also performed. The film serves as the final credit for editor Mark Livolsi, and it is dedicated to his memory. With an estimated budget of around $260 million, The Lion King is one of the most expensive films ever made.

The Lion King premiered in Hollywood on July 9, 2019, and was theatrically released in the United States on July 19, 2019, in the Dolby Cinema, RealD 3D and IMAX formats. It has grossed over $1.6 billion worldwide during its theatrical run, overtaking Frozen to become the highest-grossing animated film of all time. It also became the seventh-highest-grossing film of all time and the second-highest-grossing film of 2019. The Lion King received mixed reviews from critics, with praise for its visual effects, music, and vocal performances (particularly Rogen and Eichner), but criticism for its lack of originality and facial emotion on the characters. The film received nominations for Best Animated Feature Film and Original Song categories at the 77th Golden Globe Awards and 25th Critics' Choice Awards. It was also nominated at 73rd British Academy Film Awards and 92nd Academy Awards, both for visual effects. A prequel film, titled Mufasa: The Lion King, is set for release on July 5, 2024, with Barry Jenkins attached to direct.

Plot 

In the Pride Lands of Africa, a pride of lions rule over the animal kingdom from Pride Rock. King Mufasa and Queen Sarabi present their newborn son, Simba, to the gathering animals by Rafiki the mandrill, the kingdom's shaman and advisor.

Mufasa shows Simba the Pride Lands and explains to him the responsibilities of kingship and the "circle of life," which connects all living things. Mufasa's younger brother, Scar, covets the throne and plots to get rid of Mufasa and Simba, so he may become king. One day, Simba and his best friend Nala explore an elephant graveyard, where they are chased by a clan of spotted hyenas led by the ruthless Shenzi. Mufasa hears about the incident from his majordomo, the hornbill Zazu, and rescues the cubs. Though upset with Simba for disobeying him and putting himself and Nala in danger, Mufasa forgives him and explains that the great kings of the past watch over them from the night sky, from which he will one day watch over Simba. Meanwhile, Scar, who planned the whole thing, visits the hyenas and convinces them to help him overthrow Mufasa in exchange for hunting rights in the Pride Lands.

Scar sets a trap for his brother and nephew, luring Simba into a gorge and having the hyenas drive a large herd of wildebeest into a stampede that will trample him. He informs Mufasa of Simba's peril, knowing that he will rush to save him. Mufasa saves Simba but ends up hanging perilously from the gorge's edge. Scar refuses to help Mufasa, instead sending him falling to his death. He then tricks Simba into thinking that the tragedy was his fault and tells him to leave the Pride Lands and never return. He orders the hyenas to kill him, but Simba escapes. Scar tells the pride that the stampede killed Mufasa and Simba and steps forward as the new king, allowing the hyenas to live in the Pride Lands.

Two outcasts, Timon and Pumbaa, a meerkat and warthog, rescue Simba, who collapses in a desert. Simba grows up in the oasis with his two new friends and other animals, living a carefree life under the motto "hakuna matata" ("no worries" in Swahili).

A grown-up Simba rescues Timon and Pumbaa from a hungry lioness, who turns out to be Nala. She and Simba reunite and fall in love, and she urges him to return home, telling him that the Pride Lands have become a drought-stricken wasteland under Scar's reign. Out of guilt of supposedly causing his father's death, Simba refuses and storms off. He then encounters Rafiki, who tells him that Mufasa's spirit lives on in Simba. Simba visits the ghost of Mufasa in the night sky, who tells him that he must take his rightful place as king. Realizing that he'd been running from his past for too long, Simba decides to return to the Pride Lands.

Aided by his friends, Simba sneaks past the hyenas at Pride Rock and confronts Scar, who was about to fight Sarabi. Scar taunts Simba over his role in Mufasa's death and backs him to the edge of the rock, where he reveals to him that he murdered Mufasa. Enraged, Simba tells the truth to the rest of the pride. Scar attempts to defend himself, but his knowledge of Mufasa's last moment (despite having previously claimed that he arrived too late at the gorge) exposes his role in Mufasa's death. Timon, Pumbaa, Rafiki, Zazu, and the lionesses fend off the hyenas while Scar, attempting to escape, is cornered at a ledge near the top of Pride Rock. Scar begs for mercy and attempts to blame his crimes on the hyenas; Simba spares his life but orders him to leave the Pride Lands forever. Scar refuses and attacks his nephew, but Simba throws him off the cliff after a brief fight. Scar survives the fall but gets attacked and mauled to death by the hyenas, who overheard his attempt to betray them. Afterward, Simba takes over the kingship and makes Nala his queen.

With the Pride Lands restored to its usual state, Rafiki presents Simba and Nala's newborn cub to the assembled animals, continuing the circle of life.

Voice cast 

 Donald Glover as Simba:A lion who is the crown prince of the Pride Lands. Glover said that the film will focus more on Simba's time growing up than the original film did, stating that "[Favreau] was very keen in making sure we saw [Simba's] transition from boy to man and how hard that can be when there's been a deep trauma".
 JD McCrary as young Simba.
 Seth Rogen as Pumbaa:A slow-witted warthog who befriends and adopts a young Simba after he runs away from home. Rogen said, "[a]s an actor, I [...] don't think I'm right for every role—there are a lot of roles I don't think I'm right for even in movies I'm making—but Pumbaa was one I knew I could do well". Favreau encouraged Rogen and Timon's Billy Eichner, who did their voice recordings together, to improvise a lot. Rogen's casting would also mark the first time that Pumbaa wasn't played by Ernie Sabella, who had reprised the role for every Disney project the character was involved in up to that point.
 Chiwetel Ejiofor as Scar:The treacherous brother of Mufasa, the brother-in-law of Sarabi and the uncle of Simba who seeks to take the mantle of king of the Pride Lands. Ejiofor described Scar as more "psychologically possessed" and "brutalized" than in the original film. Ejiofor said that "especially with Scar, whether it's a vocal quality that allows for a certain confidence or a certain aggression, to always know that at the end of it you're playing somebody who has the capacity to turn everything on its head in a split second with outrageous acts of violence—that can completely change the temperature of a scene". Ejiofor also said that "[Scar and Mufasa's] relationship is completely destroyed and brutalized by Scar's way of thinking. He's possessed with this disease of his own ego and his own want". Favreau said of casting Ejiofor, "[He] is just a fantastic actor, who brings us a bit of the mid-Atlantic cadence and a new take on the character. He brings that feeling of a Shakespearean villain to bear because of his background as an actor. It's wonderful when you have somebody as experienced and seasoned as Chiwetel; he just breathes such wonderful life into this character." When Jeremy Irons was interviewed on Larry King Now on November 30, 2016, he expressed interest in reprising the role.
 Alfre Woodard as Sarabi:The Queen of the Pride Lands, Mufasa's wife, and Simba's mother.
 Billy Eichner as Timon:A wise-cracking meerkat who befriends and adopts a young Simba after he runs away from home. Eichner described Timon as "physically the smallest character, but he has one of the bigger personalities, and I love the combination of those two things. I kind of played into Timon, as I've done with many characters of mine, [the notion that] he might be small in stature but he has a huge sense of entitlement, which is always funny to play," and that "when Timon speaks and when he's quote-unquote 'being funny', he's very loud and boisterous, but [his] singing allows this vulnerable side, a slightly softer side, especially in 'Can You Feel the Love Tonight' and other moments." Eichner also talked about having "what some may consider a gay sensibility" that he brought to the table when he voiced Timon.
 John Kani as Rafiki:A wise mandrill who serves as the shaman of the Pride Lands, and a close friend of Mufasa's. Likening his role to that of a grandfather, Kani said, "Rafiki reminds all of us of that special wise relative. His wisdom, humor and his loyalty to the Mufasa dynasty is what warms our hearts towards him. [He's] always happy and wisecracking jokes as lessons of life and survival."
 John Oliver as Zazu:A hornbill who is the majordomo to the King of the Pride Lands. Speaking of his role, Oliver said, "I think Zazu is basically a bird who likes structure. He just wants things to be as they should be. I think there are British echoes there because we tend to favor structure in lieu of having an emotional reaction to anything."
 Beyoncé Knowles-Carter as Nala:Simba's childhood best friend and future love interest. According to Favreau, the character has a bigger role than in the original film. Favreau felt that "part of [Beyoncé joining the film] is that she's got young kids, part of it is that it's a story that feels good for this phase of her life and her career, and she really likes the original very much. And then, of course, there are these wonderful musical numbers that she can be involved with, and my God... she really lives up to her reputation as far as the beauty of her voice and talent".
 Shahadi Wright Joseph as young Nala. Joseph reprises her role from the Broadway production. Joseph chose to work on the film because "Nala inspires little girls [...] She's a great role model".
 James Earl Jones as Mufasa:The King of the Pride Lands, Sarabi's husband and the father of Simba. Jones reprises his role from the original 1994 animated film. According to Favreau, Jones' lines remain mostly the same from the original film. Ejiofor said that "the comfort of [Jones reprising his role] is going to be very rewarding in taking [the audience] on this journey again. It's a once-in-a-generation vocal quality". Favreau saw Jones' return as "carrying the legacy across" the original film and the remake, and felt that his voice's change in tonality compared to the original film "served the role well because he sounds like a king who's ruled for a long time".
 Florence Kasumba, Keegan-Michael Key, and Eric André voice Shenzi, Kamari, and Azizi: The Matriarch of the spotted hyena clan and her two lieutenants who join forces with Scar in order to kill Mufasa. While Shenzi is a character that was featured in the original 1994 animated film, Kamari and Azizi are the respective names of new characters loosely based on Banzai and Ed from the original film. The hyenas' characterizations were heavily altered from the original film's, as Favreau felt that they "had to change a lot" to fit the remake's realistic style, stating that "[a] lot of the stuff around them [in the original film] was very stylised". Kasumba elaborated, declaring that "[t]hose hyenas were funny. These hyenas are dangerous." Kasumba also voices Shenzi in the German dub of the film.

Additionally, Penny Johnson Jerald voices Sarafina, Nala's mother. Amy Sedaris, Chance the Rapper, Josh McCrary, and Phil LaMarr voice a guineafowl, a bushbaby, an elephant shrew, and a topi (miscredited as an impala), respectively, Timon and Pumbaa's neighbors in the oasis. J. Lee voices a hyena that chases after Timon and Pumbaa.

Production

Development 
On September 28, 2016, Walt Disney Pictures confirmed that Jon Favreau would be directing a remake of the 1994 animated film The Lion King, which would feature the songs from the 1994 film, following a string of recent box office successes of Disney live-action remake films such as Maleficent, Cinderella, Favreau's The Jungle Book, and Beauty and the Beast, with the latter three also earning critical praise. On October 13, 2016, it was reported that Disney had hired Jeff Nathanson to write the screenplay for the remake.

In November, talking with ComingSoon.net, Favreau said the virtual cinematography technology he used in The Jungle Book would be used to a greater degree in The Lion King. Although some reports reported The Lion King would be a live-action film, it actually utilizes photorealistic computer-generated animation. Disney also did not describe it as live-action, only stating it would follow the "technologically groundbreaking" approach of The Jungle Book. While the film acts as a remake of the 1994 animated film, Favreau was inspired by the Broadway adaptation of the film for certain aspects of the remake's plot, particularly Nala and Sarabi's roles. Favreau also aimed to develop his own take on the original film's story with what he said was the spectacle of a BBC wildlife documentary.

This serves as the final credit for film editor Mark Livolsi, who died in September 2018. The film is dedicated to him.

Casting 
In mid-February 2017, Donald Glover was cast as Simba, with James Earl Jones reprising his role as Mufasa from the 1994 film. In April 2017, Billy Eichner and Seth Rogen were cast to play Timon and Pumbaa, respectively. In July 2017, John Oliver was cast as Zazu. In August 2017, Alfre Woodard and John Kani were announced to play Sarabi and Rafiki, respectively.

Earlier in March 2017, it was announced that Beyoncé Knowles-Carter was Favreau's top choice for the role of Nala and that the director and studio would be willing to do whatever it took to accommodate her busy schedule. Later on November 1, 2017, her role was confirmed in an official announcement, which also confirmed that Chiwetel Ejiofor would play the role of Scar, and announced that Eric André, Florence Kasumba, and Keegan-Michael Key would be the voices of Azizi, Shenzi, and Kamari while JD McCrary and Shahadi Wright Joseph would be the voices of young Simba and young Nala, respectively. In November 2018, Amy Sedaris was announced as having been cast in a role created for the film.

Visual effects 
The Moving Picture Company, the lead vendor on The Jungle Book, provided the visual effects, which were supervised by Robert Legato, Elliot Newman, and Adam Valdez. The film uses "virtual-reality tools," according to Visual Effects Supervisor Rob Legato. Virtual Production Supervisor Girish Balakrishnan said on his professional website that the filmmakers used motion capture and VR/AR technologies. According to Favreau, MPC worked together with tech firms Magnopus and Unity Technologies to build the film's technology platform using the Unity game engine.

MPC was in charge of all the VFX shots for the film. There are 1,490 VFX shots. The animals were designed from art and photo references. From that, the characters were built; all the rigging, shapes, textures, and furs were rendered step-by-step for further improvement. After that, the animation of the animals was crafted by hand, based on the reference clips. The movements, muscles, eyes, facial expressions, and the way the animals breathe was animated for more than 30 species. The environment was created entirely in CGI from reference materials such as high-definition photos of the African landscape. All the FX simulations—such as water, dirt and fire—were created by combining VR technology with cameras shots so that scenes could be digitally built within in a VR-simulated environment. New software developed for the movie made it possible to create scenes with the shaky-cam look of a handheld camera. Sean Bailey, Disney's President of Production, said of the film's visual effects, "It's a new form of filmmaking. Historical definitions don't work. It uses some techniques that would traditionally be called animation, and other techniques that would traditionally be called live action. It is an evolution of the technology Jon [Favreau] used in Jungle Book".

Rather than have animators do everything, the team used artificial intelligence to allow virtual characters to behave in ways that mimicked real animals. The sole non-animated shot in the entire film is the sunrise in the opening scene.

Music 

Hans Zimmer, who composed the 1994 animated version, returned to compose the score for the remake with Pharrell Williams as a collaborator. Elton John also returned to rework his musical compositions from the original film before his retirement, with Knowles-Carter assisting John in the reworking of the soundtrack. John, the original film's lyricist, Tim Rice, and Knowles-Carter were also slated in 2018 to create a new song for the film. However, the collaboration between Knowles-Carter and John did not pan out as the unreleased song was not added to the official soundtrack. John and Rice also wrote a new song for the film's end credits, titled "Never Too Late" and performed by John.

"Spirit", performed by Knowles-Carter and written by herself, Ilya Salmanzadeh, and Labrinth, was released on July 9, 2019, as the lead single from the soundtrack. The film also features all the songs from the original film, a cover of The Tokens' "The Lion Sleeps Tonight", and the song "He Lives in You" from Rhythm of the Pride Lands and the Broadway production. The soundtrack, featuring Zimmer's score and John and Rice's songs, was released digitally on July 11, 2019, and physically on July 19, 2019.

Knowles-Carter also produced and curated an album titled The Lion King: The Gift, which features "Spirit", as well as songs inspired by the film. The album was released on July 19, 2019.

Marketing 
The first teaser trailer and the official teaser poster for The Lion King debuted during the annual Dallas Cowboys' Thanksgiving Day game on November 22, 2018. The trailer was viewed 224.6 million times in its first 24 hours, becoming the then 2nd-most-viewed trailer in that time period. A special sneak peek featuring John Kani's voice as Rafiki and a new poster were released during the 91st Academy Awards on February 24, 2019. On April 10, 2019, Disney released the official trailer featuring new footage which revealed Scar, Zazu, Simba and Nala (both as cubs and as adults), Sarabi, Rafiki, Timon and Pumbaa, and the hyenas. The trailer was viewed 174 million times in its first 24 hours, which was revealed on Disney's Investor Day 2019 Webcast. On May 30, 2019, 11 individual character posters were released. A special sneak peek featuring Beyoncé Knowles-Carter's, Billy Eichner's, and Seth Rogen's voices as Nala, Timon, and Pumbaa, respectively, was released on June 3, 2019. A special sneak peek featuring Knowles-Carter and Donald Glover's voices as Simba and Nala singing "Can You Feel the Love Tonight" and also featuring James Earl Jones' voice as Mufasa, was released on June 20, 2019. On July 2, 2019, Disney released an extensive behind-the-scenes featurette detailing the various aspects of the film's production along with seven publicity stills featuring the voice actors facing their animal counterparts. All-in-all, Disney spent around $145 million promoting the film.

Novelization
A tie-in novelization of the film written by Elizabeth Rudnick was published by Disney Publishing Worldwide on June 4, 2019.

Shot-for-shot claim 
The trailers of the film led to a claim of its being a shot-for-shot remake of Disney's 1994 film. On December 23, 2018, Sean Bailey, Disney's President of Production, said that while the film will "revere and love those parts that the audience wants", there will be "things in the movie that are going to be new". On April 18, 2019, Favreau stated that "some shots in the 1994 animated film are so iconic" he couldn't possibly change them, but "despite what the trailers suggest, this film is not just the same movie over again", and later said "it's much longer than the original film. And part of what we're doing here is to (give it more dimension) not just visually but both story-wise and emotionally."

On May 30, 2019, Favreau said that some of the humor and characterizations are being altered to be more consistent with the rest of the film, and this remake is making some changes in certain scenes from the original film, as well as in its structure. On June 14, 2019, Favreau said that, while the original film's main plot points would remain unchanged in the remake, the film would largely diverge from the original version, and hinted that the Elephant Graveyard, the hyenas' lair in the original film, will be replaced by a new location.<ref
name="DirectorHyenas"/> The film is approximately 30 minutes longer than the original. Despite Favreau's claims, upon release, the film was criticized by fans and critics alike for being nearly identical to the original, with many citing its overall lack of originality as a major flaw.

Release

Theatrical
The Lion King premiered in Hollywood on July 9, 2019. The film was theatrically released in the United States on July 19, 2019, in IMAX and 3D. It is one of the first theatrical films to be released on Disney+, alongside Aladdin, Toy Story 4, Frozen II, Captain Marvel, and Star Wars: The Rise of Skywalker. The film began its international rollout a week before its domestic release, starting with July 12 in China.

Home media
The Lion King was released by Walt Disney Studios Home Entertainment on Digital HD on October 11, 2019, followed by a DVD, Blu-ray, and Ultra HD Blu-ray release on October 22. It started streaming on Disney+ on January 28, 2020. With the launch of Disney+Hotstar in India on April 3, 2020, the film was made available in India as well in multiple languages.

Reception

Box office 
The Lion King grossed $543.638million in the United States and Canada, and $1.119billion in other territories, for a worldwide total of $1.663billion.

The film had a global debut of $446 million, the ninth-largest of all time and the biggest opening for an animated film. On July 30, 2019, The Lion King passed the $1 billion mark at the global box office. The Lion King became the highest-grossing animated film of all time, the highest-grossing musical film of all time, the highest-grossing remake of all time, the second-highest-grossing film of 2019, and the seventh-highest-grossing film of all time. Deadline Hollywood calculated the net profit of the film to be $580million, when factoring together all expenses and revenues.

United States and Canada 
Beginning on June 24, 2019 (which marked the 25th anniversary of the release of the original film), in its first 24 hours of pre-sales, The Lion King became the second-best pre-seller of 2019 on Fandango in that frame (behind Avengers: Endgame), while Atom Tickets reported it was their best-ever first-day sales for a family film. Three weeks prior to its release, industry tracking projected the film would gross $150–170 million in its domestic opening weekend. By the week of its release, estimates had the film debuting to as much as $180 million from 4,725 theaters, beating Avengers: Endgames record of 4,662. The film made $77.9 million on its first day, including $23 million from Thursday night previews. It went on to debut to $191.8 million over the weekend, the highest opening total of the Disney reimaginings of animated films (beating Beauty and the Beasts $174.8 million), a July release (Harry Potter and the Deathly Hallows – Part 2s $169.2 million) and Favreau's career (Iron Man 2s $128.1 million). The film had a slightly higher-than-expected drop of 60% in its second weekend, but still topped the box office with $76.6 million. It was dethroned by newcomer Hobbs & Shaw in its third weekend but still grossed $38.5 million, crossing the $400 million mark in the process. On August 21, it became the second animated film to have grossed $500 million at North America box office, after Incredibles 2. At the end of the film's box office run, it was the second highest-grossing film of 2019 in this region behind Avengers: Endgame.

Other territories 
The film was expected to gross around $450 million over its first 10 days of a global release, including $160–170 million from its worldwide opening weekend. In China, where it released a week prior to the rest of the world, the film was projected to debut to $50–60 million. It ended up opening to $54.2 million, besting the debuts of The Jungle Book and Beauty and the Beast. Over its first 8 days of global release, the film made a total of 751 million, including $351.8 million from overseas territories. This included $269.4 million from its opening weekend (sans China), with its largest countries being the United Kingdom, Ireland and Malta ($20.8 million), France ($19.6 million), Mexico ($18.7 million), Brazil ($17.9 million), South Korea ($17.7 million), Australia ($17.1 million), and Russia ($16.7 million, second-largest ever in the country), as well as $6 million in the Netherlands, the best opening of a film ever in the country. As of September 16, 2019, the film's top 10 largest markets were China ($120.4 million), the United Kingdom, Ireland and Malta ($91.3 million), France ($79 million), Brazil ($69.1 million, second-highest all time in the country), Japan ($60 million), Germany ($53.8 million), Mexico ($51.8 million), Russia ($47.3 million), Australia ($42.8 million), and Italy ($40 million). The film became the first animated and musical film to gross $1 billion at overseas box office.

As of September 2019, the film became the highest-grossing film of all time in the Netherlands ($30.2 million), surpassing previous record held by Titanic ($28.5 million including re-release) and South Africa (R107.6 million, $7.29 million), surpassing Black Panther in local currency terms (in dollar terms, is still second-highest of all time). Meanwhile, the film become the highest-grossing films of 2019 in many other countries and regions: Austria, Belgium and Luxembourg, Bulgaria, France, Algeria, Monaco, Morocco and Tunisia, Italy, Lithuania, Norway, Portugal and Angola, Russia, Serbia and Montenegro, Slovenia, Sweden, Switzerland, and Spain. It is also the highest-grossing foreign film of 2019 in Poland In India, the film grossed $26.3 million, making it the fourth-highest-grossing Hollywood or foreign films of all time, highest-grossing animated film of all time (both local and foreign films), and one of top 50 highest-grossing films of all time in India. In Europe, Middle East, and Africa the film surpass Avengers: Endgame to become the fourth-highest-grossing film of all time and highest-grossing film of 2019 across the region.

Critical response 
The website's critical consensus reads: "While it can take pride in its visual achievements, The Lion King is a by-the-numbers retelling that lacks the energy and heart that made the original so beloved—though for some fans that may just be enough." Metacritic gave the film a weighted average score of 55 out of 100, based on 54 critics, indicating "mixed or average reviews". Audiences polled by CinemaScore gave the film an average grade of "A" on an A+ to F scale, and those at PostTrak gave the film a four out of five stars.

Kenneth Turan at the Los Angeles Times called the film "polished, satisfying entertainment." Todd McCarthy at The Hollywood Reporter considered it to be inferior to the original, noting, "The film's aesthetic caution and predictability begin to wear down on the entire enterprise in the second half." At The Guardian, Peter Bradshaw found the film "watchable and enjoyable. But I missed the simplicity and vividness of the original hand-drawn images." Among the vocal performances, the roles of Eichner and Rogen as Timon and Pumbaa, respectively, received particular praise by critics, with The A.V. Clubs A. A. Dowd proclaiming: "Ultimately, only Billy Eichner and Seth Rogen, as slacker sidekicks Timon and Pumbaa, make much of an impression; their funny, possibly ad-libbed banter feels both fresh and true to the spirit of the characters—the perfect remake recipe."

Sreeparna Sengupta of The Times of India praised the film, giving it a score of 3.5/5 and stating "For those who haven’t seen the original, 'The Lion King' (2019) is certainly worth a watch for its gorgeous visuals and technical genius." Helen O'Hara of Empire Magazine gave the film 3/5 stars, saying, "The great circle of life has thrown up a gorgeous, star-studded story, but trading feeling for realism means that we lose something of the original film’s excellence." Matt Zoller Seitz of RogerEbert.com gave the film 3/4 stars, saying, "The worst thing you can say about this movie, and perhaps the highest compliment you can pay it, is to say it would be even more dazzling if it told a different story with different animals and the same technology and style—and maybe without songs, because you don't necessarily need them when you have images that sing." Kevin Maher of The Times gave the film 4/5 stars, praising it as an improvement over the original, though he criticized the ending as "descend[ing] into a sprawling Avengers-style donnybrook with little dramatic resonance." Edward Porter of The Sunday Times gave the film 3/5 stars, praising the visuals and performances, but criticizing the lack of expressiveness of the characters' faces.

A. A. Dowd, writing for The A.V. Club, summarized the film as "Joyless, artless, and maybe soulless, it transforms one of the most striking titles from the Mouse House vault into a very expensive, star-studded Disneynature film." Dowd bemoaned the film's insistence on realism, commenting, "We're watching a hollow bastardization of a blockbuster, at once completely reliant on the audience's pre-established affection for its predecessor and strangely determined to jettison much of what made it special." Scott Mendelson at Forbes condemned the film as a "crushing disappointment": "At almost every turn, this redo undercuts its own melodrama by downplaying its own emotions." David Ehrlich of IndieWire panned the film, writing, "Unfolding like the world's longest and least convincing deepfake, Jon Favreau's (almost) photorealistic remake of The Lion King is meant to represent the next step in Disney's circle of life. Instead, this soulless chimera of a film comes off as little more than a glorified tech demo from a greedy conglomerate—a well-rendered but creatively bankrupt self-portrait of a movie studio eating its own tail."

Elton John, who worked on the film's soundtrack, disowned the film and stated "The new version of The Lion King was a huge disappointment to me, because I believe they messed the music up. Music was so much a part of the original and the music in the current film didn't have the same impact. The magic and joy were lost."

Accolades

Future

Prequel 
On September 29, 2020, Deadline Hollywood reported that a follow-up film was in development with Barry Jenkins attached to direct. While The Hollywood Reporter said the film would be a prequel about Mufasa during his formative years, Deadline said it would be a sequel centering on both Mufasa's origins and the events after the first film, similar to The Godfather Part II. Jeff Nathanson, the screenwriter for the remake, has reportedly finished a draft. In August 2021, it was reported that Aaron Pierre and Kelvin Harrison Jr. had been cast as Mufasa and Scar respectively. The film will not be a remake of The Lion King II: Simba's Pride, the 1998 direct-to-video sequel to the original animated film. In September 2022 at the D23 Expo, it was announced that the film will be titled Mufasa: The Lion King and that it will follow the titular character's origin story. Seth Rogen, Billy Eichner, and John Kani will reprise their roles as Pumbaa, Timon, and Rafiki, respectively. The film is scheduled to release on July 5, 2024.

References

Notes

Citations

External links 

 
 
 
 

 

The Lion King (franchise)
2019 films
2019 3D films
2019 computer-animated films
2019 drama films
2010s adventure drama films
2010s American films
2010s coming-of-age drama films
2010s English-language films
2010s fantasy adventure films
2010s fantasy drama films
2010s musical drama films
2010s musical fantasy films
3D animated films
American 3D films
American adventure drama films
American animated adventure films
American animated fantasy films
American animated musical films
American coming-of-age drama films
American computer-animated films
American fantasy adventure films
American fantasy drama films
American musical drama films
American musical fantasy films
Animated adaptations of William Shakespeare
Animated coming-of-age films
Animated drama films
Disney film remakes
Drama film remakes
Fantasy film remakes
Fiction about regicide
Films about coups d'état
Films about father–son relationships
Films about meerkats
Films about royalty
Films based on Hamlet
Films based on works by Linda Woolverton
Films based on works by William Shakespeare
Films directed by Jon Favreau
Films produced by Jon Favreau
Films scored by Hans Zimmer
Films set in Africa
Films shot in Africa
Films shot in Los Angeles
Films using motion capture
Films with screenplays by Jeff Nathanson
Fratricide in fiction
Golden Eagle Award (Russia) for Best Foreign Language Film winners
High fantasy films
Hyenas in popular culture
IMAX films
Musical film remakes
Remakes of American films
Walt Disney Pictures animated films